is a Japanese footballer currently playing as a midfielder for Albirex Niigata (S).

Career statistics

Club
.

Notes

References

1999 births
Living people
Association football people from Kanagawa Prefecture
Kanagawa University alumni
Japanese footballers
Japanese expatriate footballers
Association football midfielders
Albirex Niigata Singapore FC players
Japanese expatriate sportspeople in Singapore
Expatriate footballers in Singapore